Amit Thaker is a political figure in India and a member of the Gujarat Legislative Assembly from the Vejalpur Assembly constituency he was elected to represent the Vejalpur Assembly constituency in December 2022,. and is associated with the Bharatiya Janata Party (BJP). Thaker has held a leadership position within the BJP, serving as the Chief of the Bharatiya Janata Yuva Morcha (BJYM) for two terms, from 1997 to 2004 and from 2007 to 2010. As the Chief of the BJYM,

References 

Members of the Gujarat Legislative Assembly
Year of birth missing (living people)
Living people